Dragonfly is a fantasy, horror novel by author Frederic S. Durbin.  It was released in 1999 by Arkham House in an edition of 4,000 copies.  It was the author's first novel.

Plot summary

Ten-year-old Bridget Ann (nicknamed "Dragonfly") lives in her Uncle Henry's funeral parlor.  Uncle Henry summons Mothkin, a hunter, to investigate strange things happening in the basement as Hallowe'en approaches.  In the basement, Dragonfly and Mothkin discover a doorway to a spooky underground world, known as Harvest Moon, which is ruled by an evil despot, Samuel Hain.  Dragonfly is separated from Mothkin and meets up with a werewolf named Sylva who protects her from Hain.  Eventually, she reunites with Mothkin for a final battle with Hain.

Reprints
Mechanicsburg, PA: Science Fiction Book Club, 2001
New York: Ace Books, 2005

References

Footnotes

1999 American novels
American fantasy novels
American horror novels
Halloween novels